Taweila  is a Syrian village located in Abu al-Duhur Nahiyah in Idlib District, Idlib.  According to the Syria Central Bureau of Statistics (CBS), Taweila had a population of 175 in the 2004 census.

References 

Populated places in Idlib District